Shikogawa Dam is a gravity dam located in Ehime Prefecture in Japan. The dam is used for irrigation and power production. The catchment area of the dam is 17.2 km2. The dam impounds about 8  ha of land when full and can store 1300 thousand cubic meters of water. The construction of the dam was started on 1987 and completed in 2010.

References

Dams in Ehime Prefecture
2010 establishments in Japan